
Julia Michaels is an American singer-songwriter. After releasing two extended plays worth of music independently, Julia turned to writing for other artists and gained much success when she developed a close writing partnership with Justin Tranter. During that time, they have scored numerous Billboard chart-toppers and was labelled as one of Rolling Stone's "20 Biggest Breakouts of 2015" for their writing efforts of that year. When her song writing career was at its peak, she eventually began releasing music under her own name and returned with her 2017 single "Issues", which peaked at number 11 on the Billboard Hot 100 in the United States and was certified quintuple-platinum by the Recording Industry Association of America (RIAA).

This list of songs is split into the full list of contributions and those that have performed in the charts across various countries. Additionally, the international singles and certifications are placed by order of the song's initial release, which may coincide with an album release.

Songs written

International singles and certifications

Notes

References

Michaels, Julia
Songs written by Julia Michaels